Peart is the surname of:

Alan Peart (1922–2018), New Zealand Second World War flying ace
Bob Peart (1926–1966), English football player
Charles Peart (1759–1798), British sculptor
Darrell Peart (born 1950), American furniture maker and designer
Ernest Grafford Peart (1918–1981), Jamaican politician and diplomat
Fred Peart, Baron Peart (1914–1988), British politician
Greg Peart (born 1946), Australian former politician
Jack Peart (1888–1948), English footballer
Jack Peart (footballer, born 1884) (1884–1965), English footballer
John Peart (artist) (1945/1946–2013), Australian artist
Joseph Peart (1900–1942), New Zealand Second World War army lieutenant colonel and headmaster
Matt Peart (born 1997), Jamaican-American football player
Michael Peart (judge) (born 1953), Irish judge
Michael Peart (politician), Jamaican politician
Myles Peart-Harris (born 2002), English football player
Neil Peart (1952–2020), Canadian musician and author, second drummer of Rush
Neil Peart (footballer) (born 1958), former Australian rules footballer
Paul Peart, British comics artist
Ron Peart (1920–1999), English footballer
Stirling Peart (1890–1963), American rugby union player
William Stanley Peart (born 1922), British doctor and clinical researcher

See also
Pert (disambiguation)